Friedrich Karl Akel ( in Kaubi (now Pornuse) village, Mulgi Parish) – 3 July 1941 in Tallinn) was an Estonian diplomat and politician, a member of the International Olympic Committee, and Head of State of Estonia in 1924. Following the June 1940 Soviet invasion and occupation Estonia, Akel was arrested by the new Stalinist terror regime and, like most senior Estonian politicians at the time, was killed in Soviet captivity soon afterwards. The Soviet NKVD executed Akel in Tallinn in July 1941. 

Akel attended the Alexander Gymnasium in Tartu, and studied in the department of medicine of Tartu University in 1892–1897. He was an assistant in the Tartu University Clinic, a doctor in the Reimers ophthalmology clinic in Riga, 1899–1901 a doctor in the Ujazdov hospital in Warsaw. In 1901, he studied in Berlin, Prague and Leipzig. Akel worked a private ophthalmologist in Tallinn, and in 1907 he was one of the founders of the Private Clinic of Estonian Physicians. In 1912 he founded his own eye clinic. In 1904–1905 he was in the Russo-Japanese war as a physician. He was also a member and a chairman of the Tallinn Municipal Council, and the Honorary Justice of the Peace in the Tallinn-Haapsalu Peace Council.

Akel was a member the board of the Northern Baltic Union of Physicians and the Tallinn Popular Education society, chairman of the sports society "Kalev", building society of "Estonia" theatre and the Estonian Society "Estonia" in Tallinn, member and chairman of the council and member of the Board of the Tallinn Loan and Savings Society, later the Tallinn "Krediitpank" (Credit Bank), 1920–1922 vice president of the consistory of the Estonian Evangelical Lutheran Church, and in 1927–1932 Estonia's representative in the International Olympic Committee.

Akel was Estonia's Elder of State in March – December 1924, and served three times as foreign minister. He was also Estonia's envoy in Finland, Sweden and Germany. From 1926 until 1929, Akel was a member of Riigikogu (Parliament), representing the Christian People's Party, in 1937 of the Estonian National Assembly (Rahvuskogu), and in 1938–1940 of Riiginõukogu (the upper chamber of Parliament).

In October 1940, Akel was imprisoned by the Soviet NKVD. He was shot to death in Tallinn on 3 July 1941. His wife, Adele Karoline Tenz, was deported to the USSR in June 1941 and died there in 1944.

Awards
 1925: Order of the Three Stars I
 1927: Order of the Estonian Red Cross I/II
 1934: Order of the Pole Star of Sweden, Grand Cross°
 1935: Order of the Cross of the Eagle I
 1936: Order of the Estonian Red Cross I/I
 1938: Order of the White Star I
 Poland: Order of the White Eagle

References and sources
References

Sources
 Friedrich (Karl) Akel
 Ülo Kaevats et al. 2000. Eesti Entsüklopeedia, volume 14. Tallinn: Eesti Entsüklopeediakirjastus, 

1871 births
1941 deaths
People from Mulgi Parish
People from Kreis Pernau
Estonian Lutherans
Christian People's Party (Estonia) politicians
Heads of State of Estonia
Ministers of Foreign Affairs of Estonia
Government ministers of Estonia
Members of the Riigikogu, 1926–1929
Members of the Estonian National Assembly
Members of the Riiginõukogu
Ambassadors of Estonia to Germany
Ambassadors of Estonia to Sweden
Ambassadors of Estonia to Finland
Envoys of Estonia
Estonian ophthalmologists
International Olympic Committee members
University of Tartu alumni
Recipients of the Military Order of the Cross of the Eagle, Class I
Deaths by firearm in Estonia
Estonian people executed by the Soviet Union
People executed by the Soviet Union by firing squad
Prisoners who died in Soviet detention